First Class All the Way is an American reality television series which premiered on November 3, 2008, on the Bravo cable network. Announced in November 2007, the show chronicles the professional live of Sara Duffy, a founder of multimillion-dollar travel concierge business based in Los Angeles. The series features as she, with the help of her staff, tries hard to provide high-class service to their clients who are often very demanding and include billionaires, socialites and entertainment magnates.

Episodes

References

External links 
 
 

2000s American reality television series
2008 American television series debuts
2008 American television series endings
Bravo (American TV network) original programming
English-language television shows